The 2020 Alabama State Hornets football team represented Alabama State University as a member of the East Division of the Southwestern Athletic Conference (SWAC) during 2020–21 NCAA Division I FCS football season. Led by third-year head coach Donald Hill-Eley, the Hornets compiled an overall record of 3–3 with a mark of 3–2 in conference play, tying for second place in the SWAC East Division. Alabama State played home games at New ASU Stadium in Montgomery, Alabama.

On July 20, 2020, the SWAC announced that it would not play fall sports due to the COVID-19 pandemic. The conference then formalized plans to conduct a schedule for football during the 2021 spring semester.

Schedule
Due to the SWAC's postponement of the 2020 football season to spring 2021, games against Kennesaw State, and Texas Tech were canceled. The SWAC released updated spring schedules on August 17.

Game summaries

Southern

Jackson State

South Carolina State

Mississippi Valley State

vs. Alabama State

References

Alabama State
Alabama State Hornets football seasons
Alabama State Hornets football